The 1999–2000 Omani League was the 24th edition of the top football league in Oman. Dhofar S.C.S.C. were the defending champions, having won the previous 1998–99 Omani League season. Al-Oruba SC emerged as the champions of the 1999–2000 Omani League with a total of 42 points.

Teams
This season the league had 10 teams. Oman Club and Al-Ittihad Club were relegated to the Second Division League after finishing in the relegation zone in the 1998–99 season. The two relegated teams were replaced Second Division League teams Ruwi Club and Bawshar Club.

Stadia and locations

League table

Top level Omani football league seasons
1999–2000 in Omani football
Oman